is a Japanese female volleyball player who plays for the Japan National Volleyball team.

Clubs
Kawagoe Municipal High School → Takefuji Bamboo (2006–2009) → JT Marvelous（2009-2014）

National team
  2006, 2009, 2011

Awards

Individuals
2006 Kurowashiki All Japan Volleyball Tournament: New Face award
2007 2006-07 V.Premier League: New Face award

Team
2009-2010 V.Premier League -  Runner-Up, with JT Marvelous.
2010 59th Kurowashiki All Japan Volleyball Tournament -  Runner-Up, with JT Marvelous.
2010-11 V.Premier League -  Champion, with JT Marvelous.
2011 60th Kurowashiki All Japan Volleyball Tournament -  Champion, with JT Marvelous.

National team
 2006 6th place in the World Championship in Japan

References

 FIVB Biography
 JT official website profile

1987 births
Living people
Takefuji Bamboo players
JT Marvelous players
Asian Games medalists in volleyball
Volleyball players at the 2006 Asian Games
Japanese women's volleyball players
People from Ageo, Saitama
Sportspeople from Saitama Prefecture
Asian Games silver medalists for Japan
Medalists at the 2006 Asian Games